Sisyphus is a genus of dung beetles comprising more than 90 species. Adults are characterised by their long hind legs.

Distribution
Africa, Eurasia, Asia, Central America and Australia.

Habits
Adults separate balls of dung from droppings and roll them some distance over the soil surface before burying them. Eggs are laid in the buried dung; this provides a source of food for the larvae once they hatch.

Species
One common species is Sisyphus schaefferi (Linnaeus, 1758).

References

Scarabaeinae